Idle Will Kill is the second (and final) album by the punk band Osker, released on Epitaph Records in 2001.

In an interview with Mean Street magazine, lead guitarist and songwriter Devon Williams said about the album: "I think I have grown into my mind.  I know who I am, and I have an identity.  I know how I work. Idle Will Kill describes me better.  The underlying theme of all the songs is about me being my own person.  The songs are a realization that I’m all I have.  And all of these other people are excessive, and sometimes, they are really disappointing."

Track listing

References

2001 albums